Come to Me may refer to:

Albums
 Come to Me (Juice Newton album), 1977
 Come to Me, a 1994 re-release of France Joli's eponymous 1979 album

Songs
 "Come to Me" (Diddy song), 2006
 "Come to Me" (Diesel song), 1991
 "Come to Me" (France Joli song), 1979
 "Come to Me" (Goo Goo Dolls song), 2013
 "Come to Me" (Marv Johnson song), 1959
 "Come to Me" (Ricky Martin song), 2002
 "Come to Me" (Sarkodie song), 2017
 "Come to Me", by Otis Redding from The Great Otis Redding Sings Soul Ballads, 1964
 "Come to Me", by Björk from Debut, 1993
 "Come to Me", by Bobby Caldwell from Bobby Caldwell, 1978
 "Come to Me", by Celine Dion from Miracle, 2004
 "Come to Me", by Damien Leith from Night of My Life, 2006
 "Come to Me", by Jesse McCartney from Beautiful Soul, 2004
 "Come to Me", by Johnny Mathis from Johnny's Greatest Hits, 1958
 "Come to Me", by Tommy James and the Shondells, 1970
 "Come to Me", by Treasure, 2020
 "Come to Me", by Vangelis from Voices, 1995
 "Come to Me", from the film Indiscreet, 1931